Terbium oxide may refer to either of the following:

Terbium(III) oxide, Tb2O3
Terbium(III,IV) oxide, Tb4O7